Hasan Akbar Kamal, (1946 – 2017) was a notable Pakistani poet and children novel writer. He was awarded Adamjee Literary Award in 1980. He was a Professor of English and was influenced by poetry of the Romantics.

Books
He wrote the following notable books:
Sukhan
Khizan mera mausam
Kamal kay mazameen

Iltija

References

1946 births
2017 deaths
Pakistani poets
Pakistani children's writers
Urdu-language poets from Pakistan
People from Agra
Muhajir people
Recipients of the Adamjee Literary Award